is a railway station on the Shinano Railway Kita-Shinano Line in Nakagoe, in the city of Nagano, Japan, operated by the third-sector railway operating company Shinano Railway. It is also a freight terminal for the Japan Freight Railway Company.

Lines
Kita-Nagano Station is served by the 37.3 km Kita-Shinano Line, and is 3.9 kilometers from the starting point of the line at Nagano Station. Some trains of the Iiyama Line continue past the nominal terminus of the line at Toyono Station and terminate at Nagano Station, stopping at this station en route.

Station layout
The station consists of one elevated side platform and one elevated island platform serving three tracks, with the station building located underneath

Platforms

History
It was renamed Kita-Nagano Station on 1 April 1957. With the privatization of Japanese National Railways (JNR) on 1 April 1987, the station came under the control of East Japan Railway Company (JR East).

From this date, Kita-Nagano Station was transferred to the ownership of the third-sector operating company Shinano Railway.

Passenger statistics
In fiscal 2016,  the station was used by an average of 2,187 passengers daily (boarding passengers only).

Surrounding area
Yoshida Elementary School
Nagano Sports Park is approximately 20 minutes away on foot

See also
 List of railway stations in Japan

References

External links

  

Railway stations in Nagano (city)
Iiyama Line
Railway stations in Japan opened in 1898
Kita-Shinano Line
Stations of Japan Freight Railway Company